Matkule parish is an administrative unit of Tukums Municipality in the Courland region of Latvia. From 2009 until 2021, it was part of the former Kandava Municipality.

References 

Parishes of Latvia
Tukums Municipality
Courland